The Monti Sicani  are a mountain chain in the central-southern Sicily, southern Italy, included between the Agrigento and Palermo. The name also indicates a series of comuni (municipalities) lying in the area.

The territory is characterized by a hilly area, clay and sandstone being the predominant rocks, used for pasture, and a proper mountain area, above 900 m of altitude, with Mesozoic limestone rocks. There are numerous peaks over the 1,000 m, with the  Rocca Busambra (1,613 m), Monte delle Rose (1,436 m), Monte Barraù (also called Monte Barracù) (1,420 m) and the Monte Cammarata overcoming 1578 m.

Biodiversity[change | editing wikitext]

Fauna 
The territory of the Sicani Mountains offers different habitats to wildlife that is very rich in vertebrates and invertebrates.

Among the birds, there are several species of rare birds of prey such as the Golden Eagle and the Egyptian Capovaccaio (there are here the only breeding sites in Sicily), and others more widespread such as the Peregrine Falcon,  the Kestrel,  the Barn owl.

The most common reptiles are the Viper, the Natrice, the Ramarro and the Land Turtle.

Mammals include the Marten, the Herring. the Wild Cat, and the Fox,

See also
Sicani
Monte delle Rose

External links
 Monti Sicani portal 

Mountains of Sicily
Mountain ranges of Italy
Mountain ranges of Sicily